Yesvantpur – Pandharpur Express is  an Express train belonging to South Western Railway zone of Indian Railways that run between  and  in India.

Background
This train was inaugurated on 2 March 2015, between Yeshwantpur and Miraj as Tatkal special train with number 06541 / 06542 and runs only on Summer and Winter time but the demand was high for connectivity between Bangalore and Pandharpur. In May 2018 the South Western Railway announced that the route would be operated as regular weekly service beginning 5 July 2018.

Service
Frequency of this train is weekly and it covers the distance of 880 km with an average speed of 52 km/h on both sides.

Routes

Traction
As the route is under electrification a WDP-4 loco pulls the train to its destination on both sides.

External links
 16541 Yesvantpur Pandharpur Express
 16542 Pandharpur Yesvantpur Express

References

Express trains in India
Rail transport in Karnataka
Rail transport in Maharashtra
Transport in Bangalore